Tavertet is a small town located above some cliffs, 900m above sea level, in the area known as Collsacabra, north of the Guilleries, in the comarca of Osona in Catalonia.

Below the cliffs is Pantà de Sau, a reservoir that dammed the waters of the river Ter in the 1960s.
Tavertet is nowadays a tourist-oriented town with many holiday homes, where Raimon Panikkar lived.
Tavertet is linked by road BV5207 to the town of L'Esquirol, also known as Santa Maria de Corcó. There is also a minor road north of the village above the cliffs through a beech forest linking the town to Rupit.

References

External links
 Government data pages 
Link with the web page: Associació Amics de Tavertet (in Catalan)

Municipalities in Osona